Metal Meets Classic Live + All G.U.N. Bonustracks is a live concert recording by German heavy metal band Rage, released as a DVD in November 2001 under name Rage & Lingua Mortis Orchestra. 

The DVD was released in 2001 by GUN Records without asking the band for permission. It contains a concert from 7 May 1998 in E-Werk in Cologne. That gig was recorded by the German TV station WDR for their Rockpalast show.

Although the DVD carries a "full live show" label on the front cover, it contains only 74 of the 113 recorded minutes. However, some rare audio material was added to the audio side of this DVD.

Track listing

DVD
Recorded live at E-Werk, Cologne, Germany.

All G.U.N. Bonustracks CD track listing

Personnel

Band members 
Peter "Peavy" Wagner – vocals, bass
Spiros Efthimiadis – guitars
Sven Fischer – guitars
Chris Efthimiadis – drums

Additional musicians 
 Lingua Mortis Orchestra

Production 
 Christian Wolff – producer

References 

Rage (German band) albums
2001 albums
GUN Records video albums
2001 video albums
Symphonic metal video albums